Natalie Maree Hutchins (née Sykes, born 9 March 1972), also known as Natalie Sykes-Hutchins, is an Australian politician. She has been a Labor Party member of the Victorian Legislative Assembly since 2010, representing the electorates of Keilor (2010–2014) and Sydenham (2014–present).

Hutchins was the Minister for Local Government, Minister for Aboriginal Affairs and Minister for Industrial Relations in the First Andrews Ministry from December 2014 to December 2018. In June 2020, she rejoined the cabinet as Minister for Victim Support and Minister for Corrections, Youth Justice and Crime Prevention. In June 2022, she was appointed as Minister for Education and Minister for Women.

A former union organiser, Hutchins was first woman to be elected Assistant Secretary of the Victorian Trades Hall Council (VTHC). She was a senior advisor to the former Premier of Victoria, Steve Bracks, Chief of Staff to the former Victorian Minister of Education, Mary Delahunty, and was a founding partner in the research and strategy company Global Workplace Solutions. Hutchins, a member of Labor's Unity faction, is a member of the Australian Labor Party National Executive.

The widow of Steve Hutchins, a former Senator for New South Wales, she has one child and five step-children.

Early life and background 
Educated at public schools in the north-western suburbs of Melbourne including St Albans North Primary School and Buckley Park High School. She completed a Bachelor of Arts at La Trobe University, where she was the president of the La Trobe University Labor Club and the Victorian President of the National Union of Students. While in high school and studying for her degree she worked variously as a waitress, a dance teacher and a printer's assistant.

Her great-great grandfather, Hughie Sykes, was one of the first members of the Waterside Workers' Federation of Australia.

Career
Following her graduation, Hutchins became an organiser and industrial officer at the National Union of Workers.  In 1996 she was the first woman to be elected as the assistant secretary of the Victorian Trades Hall Council, in the organisation's 137-year history. During her time at the VTHC, Hutchins was one of the police negotiators for the union movement during the 1998 waterfront dispute, coordinated the WorkCover campaign and was instrumental in obtaining legislative changes to stop trainee and apprentice bullying in the workplace.  In 1999, shortly after the 1999 election of the Bracks Labor Government, Hutchins resigned her position at the VTHC citing "leadership tensions".

In 2001, Hutchins was employed as a senior organiser with the Transport Workers Union of Australia (TWU) where she negotiated national wages agreements in the airlines, car carrying and road transport industries. A key event during her time with the TWU was the collapse and closure of airline Ansett Australia.

Hutchins started a business partnership in 2007, called Globe Workplace, which focused on workplace research and strategy across Australia. Globe Workplace staff have completed major research projects for both state and federal governments into workforce skills shortages in the transport, logistics manufacturing industries.

Hutchins is a member of the Australian Workers Union component of the Victorian Labor Right.

Political career 
Hutchins was a senior advisor to the former Premier of Victoria, Steve Bracks and Chief of Staff and to the former Minister of Education, Mary Delahunty. Long considered by Labor as a future Member of Parliament, Hutchins' name was proposed in June 2000 for preselection for the Victorian Federal Seat of Isaacs following the death of the sitting member Greg Wilton. In 2006, her name was briefly mentioned as a preselection candidate for the NSW state seat of Blue Mountains following the move of Bob Debus to the Federal Parliament.

In 2009, following the retirement of George Seitz, who had held the seat for Labor since 1982, Hutchins was endorsed by Labor's National Executive as the candidate for Keilor in the 2010 Victorian state election. Hutchins was subsequently elected and was appointed as Shadow Parliamentary Secretary for Public Transport in a February 2012 reshuffle. On 19 February 2013, she was promoted to the Shadow Cabinet as Shadow Minister for Industrial Relations, Ports, Freight & Logistics.

After Labor's win in the 2014 state election, Hutchins was appointed as minister for local government, industrial relations and Aboriginal affairs. After Fiona Richardson died in August 2017, Hutchins took over Richardson's roles as minister for women and the prevention of family violence in September 2017, but relinquished the local government portfolio.

After the 2018 state election, Hutchins asked not to be reappointed to the ministry, so that she could spend more time with her children following the recent death of her husband and former Senator Steve Hutchins. Hutchins returned to the ministry in June 2020 when she was appointed as minister for Corrections, Youth Justice, Crime Prevention and Victim Support.

In June 2022, Hutchins was appointed as Minister for Education and for the second time, as Minister for Women.

References

External links
 Parliamentary voting record of Natalie Hutchins at Victorian Parliament Tracker

1972 births
Living people
La Trobe University alumni
Australian Labor Party members of the Parliament of Victoria
Labor Right politicians
Members of the Victorian Legislative Assembly
Victorian Ministers for Women
Spouses of Australian politicians
21st-century Australian politicians
21st-century Australian women politicians
Women members of the Victorian Legislative Assembly